Crnković may refer to:

 House of Crnković, a Croatian noble family
 Crnković, Croatian surname
 Krešimir Crnković (born 1995), Croatian biathlete and cross country skier
 Milan Crnković (1925-1998), Croatian children's literature professor and critic
 Tomislav Crnković (disambiguation), multiple peope
 Zlatko Crnković (disambiguation), multiple people

Croatian surnames